Macintosh Centris is a family of personal computers designed, manufactured and sold by Apple Computer, Inc. in 1992 and 1993.  They were introduced as a replacement for the six-year-old Macintosh II family of computers; the name was chosen to indicate that the consumer was selecting a Macintosh in the center of Apple's product line.  Centris machines were the first to offer Motorola 68040 CPUs at a price point around US$2,500, making them significantly less expensive (albeit slower) than Quadra computers, but also offering higher performance than the Macintosh LC computers of the time.

Apple released three computers bearing the Centris name: the Centris 610 (replacing the Macintosh IIsi) and Centris 650 (replacing the Macintosh IIci in form and the Quadra 700 in function), both of which were introduced in March 1993, and the Centris 660AV which followed in July.  Apple also considered the Macintosh IIvx to be part of the Centris line.  The IIvx was released in October of the previous year but, according to Apple, their lawyers were unable to complete the trademark check on the "Centris" name in time for the IIvx's release.

The retirement of the Centris name was announced in September 1993, with the 610, 650 and 660AV all being rebranded the following month as Macintosh Quadra machines as part of Apple's effort to reposition their product families to correlate with customer markets instead of price ranges and features. The IIvx was also discontinued in favor of the newly announced Quadra 605.

Overview
The Centris 610 uses a 20 MHz 68LC040 CPU, which has no math coprocessor functions. It used a new "pizza box" case that was intended to be placed under the user's computer monitor. The Centris 610 also provided the basis for the Workgroup Server 60. This case was also used for the Power Macintosh 6100 lines of computers and, when these later computers were introduced, Apple offered consumers a product upgrade path by letting them buy a new motherboard. Apple's motherboard upgrades of this type were considered expensive, however, and were not a popular option. 

The base-configuration Centris 650 uses a 25 MHz 68LC040 CPU; while more expensive configurations with built-in Ethernet use the 25 MHz 68040 allowing it to succeed the Quadra 700. It uses the Macintosh IIvx-style desktop case.

The Centris 660AV uses a 25 MHz 68040 and also includes an AT&T 3210 digital signal processor. Like other "AV" computers from Apple, it supports both video input and output. It uses the "pizza box" case which debuted earlier in the Centris 610.

The Centris 610 and 650 were replaced about six months after their introduction by the Quadra 610 and 650 models, which kept the same case and designs but raised the CPU speeds from 20 MHz and 25 MHz to 25 MHz and 33 MHz, respectively – while the Centris 660AV was renamed as the Quadra 660AV without any actual design change. These Macs also existed during Apple's transition from auto-inject floppy drives to manual-inject drives. This is why there are two different styles of floppy drive bezel (faceplate) on these models. Some later Centris 660AV Macs have manual-inject floppy drives, so this change was not entirely concurrent with the name change.

Timeline

References